Francis George Mostyn (1800–1847) was a Roman Catholic bishop who served as the Vicar Apostolic of the Northern District of England from 1840 to 1847.

He was born in 1800, the son of Charles Browne Mostyn, of Kidlington, Oxfordshire, by his second wife, Miss Tucker. His grandfather was Sir Edward Mostyn, 5th Mostyn Baronet, of Talacre. Francis began his  education at St Mary's College, Oscott in 1813, leaving three years later, only to return as an ecclesiastical student in December 1822. He was ordained to the priesthood in 1828, and for the next twelve years he served the mission in Wolverhampton.

He was appointed the Vicar Apostolic of the Northern District and Titular Bishop of Abydus on 22 September 1840. His consecration to the Episcopate took place on 21 December 1840, the principal consecrator was Bishop John Briggs, with  bishops Walsh and Brown as co-consecrators.

He died in office at Durham on 11 August 1847, aged 47, and was buried in the cemetery at Ushaw College.

References

Bibliography

 

1800 births
1847 deaths
19th-century Roman Catholic bishops in England
Apostolic vicars of England and Wales